IBMP may refer to:
 3-isobutyl-2-methoxypyrazine; see methoxypyrazines
 Russian Institute for Biomedical Problems or Institute of Biomedical Problems (:ru:Институт медико-биологических проблем РАН), known for the MARS-500 experiment simulating crewed flight to Mars; cf. Russian Academy of Sciences#Institutions
 International Breast Milk Project